Cultural materialism refers to two separate scholarly endeavours: 

 Cultural materialism (anthropology), an anthropological research orientation first introduced by Marvin Harris
 Cultural materialism (cultural studies), a movement in literary theory and cultural studies originating with left-wing literary critic Raymond Williams

es:materialismo cultural
hr:Kulturni materijalizam